Eva Bendix Petersen is a post-structuralist psychologist and sociologist of education. She is currently Professor of Higher Education in the Department of People and Technology at Roskilde University, Denmark.  She is known for her work on academic cultures and labour, her critique of the neoliberalisation of universities, and her experimentation with new scientific genres, for example, ethnographic dramas.

References

 http://www.education.monash.edu.au/research/seminars/show.php?id=3561&archive=true
http://forskning.ruc.dk/site/en/persons/eva-bendix-petersen(95993f9f-3c44-427f-8198-93bc73c66b04).html

External links
 https://ruc-dk.academia.edu/EvaBendixPetersen
 https://video.ruc.dk/media/t/0_yol9smg0

Year of birth missing (living people)
Living people